Brookville Jr./Sr. High School is a public school, serving Grades 7–12, in Jefferson County, Pennsylvania. The school is home to 763 students and 62 Staff.

Alma Mater 
We hail thee, Brookville High
Now and in future years;

We sing our many praises to
The school each one reveres.

For ever we'll be loyal
To colors blue and white;

And cherish fond memories
Of our Raider's valiant fight.

We hail you Alma Mater;
And when youth has passed us by.

Even then with fleeting breath;
We praise old Brookville High.

Athletics

Senior High Athletics

Junior High Athletics

References

Public high schools in Pennsylvania
Public middle schools in Pennsylvania
Schools in Jefferson County, Pennsylvania